Live in Wichita is a live album by Casting Pearls, now known as VOTA. It contains three live songs from the band's self-titled album Casting Pearls and two songs from the fall 2008 self-titled album VOTA.

Track listing 
 "Alright"
 "Love's Done Something"
 "You Alone"
 "Be Mine"
 "Free to Fail"

References 

VOTA albums
2007 live albums